14th Street Line can refer to the following transit lines:
 BMT 14th Street Line (rapid transit), Manhattan, New York
 14th Street Crosstown Line (surface) (bus, formerly streetcar), Manhattan, New York
 14th Street Line (Washington, D.C.), now the Route 52 and 54 buses